Universality most commonly refers to:

 Universality (philosophy)
 Universality (dynamical systems)

 Universality principle may refer to:

 In statistics, universality principle, a property of systems that can be modeled by random matrices
 In law, as a synonym for universal jurisdiction
 In moral philosophy, the first formulation of Kant's categorical imperative. 

Universality may also refer to several concepts that are also known as "universality"
 Background independence, a concept of universality in physical science
 Turing-complete, a concept of universality in computation
 Universal property, a mathematical concept
 Universal jurisdiction, in international law
 Lepton universality in the Standard Model of particle physics.
 Universality of the Church, a theological concept in Christian ecclesiology

See also 
Universal (disambiguation)
Universalism (disambiguation)
Universality probability
Universalization
Universalizability